HKD Napredak (meaning "Croat Cultural Society Napredak") is a cultural society of Croats of Bosnia and Herzegovina.

History
Napredak was formed as the "Croatian aid society for the needs of students in middle and higher schools from Bosnia and Herzegovina" in Mostar and the "Croatian society for the placement of children in trades and business" in Sarajevo, both in 1902. In 1907 the two groups united, taking on the current name. In 1922 all founding members received the certificates of the Society showing relevant symbols and images of the main buildings in different towns and cities.

Napredak's headquarters are in Sarajevo where the organization built the impressive Napredak Palace in 1913. The Napredak Palace Construction Board was formed in 1911. Its primary role was to facilitate construction, and to ensure further funding. The board members were as follows: Ante Tandarić, Anto Alaupović, Mijo Vučak, Ivan Renđec, Ljudevit Dvorniković, Nikola Krešić, Albert Draganić, Jozo Udovčić, Matej Kakarigi, Ivan Budimir, Dane Cvitković, Petar Maričić i Nikola Palandžić.

The society continued its work until 1949 when it was disbanded by Yugoslav authorities. It was reformed in 1990 with about 20,000 members under the leadership of its president Franjo Topić. Between 1990 and 2019, Napredak organized more than 9,000 events, and awarded 2,890 stipends.

The society's original purpose was to help educate youths by offering scholarships. The society broadened its aim to include preserving the Croat culture of all of Bosnia and Herzegovina. Napredak has dozens of branches all over the country as well as in Croatia.

Famous people given scholarships by Napredak 
Ivo Andrić, Nobel Prize winner in literature
Vladimir Prelog, Nobel Prize winner in chemistry

Presidents
Anto Palandžić (1907)
Tugomir Alaupović (1907–1909)
Antun Tandarić (1909–1921)
Aleksa Đebić (1921–1923)
Anto Alaupović (1923–1945)
Vlado Čaldarević (1945–1949)
Franjo Topić (1990–2019)
Nikola Čiča (2019–)

References

External links 

Organizations established in 1907
1907 establishments in Austria-Hungary
Bosnia and Herzegovina culture
Croats of Bosnia and Herzegovina
Culture in Sarajevo